"Miss Subways" was a title accorded to individual New York City women between 1941 and 1976. The woman who was Miss Subways at any one time appeared on posters placed on New York City Subway trains, along with a brief description of her. In 1957, it was estimated that 5.9 million people viewed Miss Subways daily, using 14,000 placards within trains. The program was run by the New York Subways Advertising Company. Around 200 women held the title during the program's run.

Selection

The method of selecting Miss Subways varied over time, typically taking the form of a beauty contest with the general rule that to be eligible, a woman had to be a New York City resident and herself use the subway. "John Robert Powers, the head of the modeling agency, selected the winners" until 1961 or 1962 and later "for some years, winners were chosen by the contest organizers."

Before 1952, there were monthly selections of Miss Subways. From 1952 to 1957, candidates were picked every two months. Although "Mr. Powers once picked seven winners to reign side by side in the subway." By 1957, they were all hand-picked based on how much they exuded a "girl next door" quality:

John Robert Powers was no longer involved in selection by 1963 when the contest changed to "public vote ... by post card". The first winner of the public vote was Ann Napolitano who was an executive secretary at the advertising agency Doyle, Dane & Bernbach. The New York Subways Advertising Company "redirected the contest to reflect the girl who works – what New York City is all about." Winners were given bracelets with gold-plated (later, silver-plated) subway tokens." Spaulding commented in 1971 that "Prettiness per se is passe. It's personality and interest pursuits that count" and described how "each contest attracts between 300 and 400 entries, submitted by family, friends and colleagues. About 30 are selected for a personal interview 'to judge personality and make certain that the submitted picture is a good likeness.' Most of the winners have been stenographers, clerks, receptionists and some have been teachers and stewardesses."

Subsequent to the postcard system, winners were usually chosen by telephone-based voting, from among a group of nominees whose photos were all placed on the subways. Title holders were photographed by photographers such as James J. Kriegsmann who "specialized in pictures of stage and screen stars, but he also photographed ordinary people, including the women who appeared in the Miss Subways promotion for more than 30 years."

In 2004, the Metropolitan Transportation Authority, in conjunction with the New York Post, brought back the program, now named "Ms. Subways", for one year only. A voting contest was held to determine the winner, Caroline Sanchez-Bernat, an actress. Posters of "Ms. Subways" appeared with subway safety tips instead of biographical notes.

Significance

Miss Subways began as a way for the John Robert Powers Agency "to promote his models and for the New York Subways Advertising Company 'to increase eye traffic' for the adjoining ... advertisements." "The contest provided the main plot device of Leonard Bernstein's 1944 musical On The Town, in which a smitten sailor on leave searched for 'Miss Turnstiles.'"

By 1945, the four-year anniversary of the contest was commemorated nationally in Life Magazine. "Unlike Miss America, these queens represented the full spectrum of their constituency, mainly Irish, Italian, Latina and Jewish. The first black winner reigned on the trains in 1947 (36 years before a black Miss America), the first Asian in 1949." Thelma Potter, who was studying at Brooklyn College at the time, was the first black Miss Subways. Potter stated, "It was progressive. ... It stirred things up a bit.'"

The New York Subway Advertising Company was owned by Walter O'Malley, who moved the Brooklyn Dodgers to Los Angeles in 1958. Bernard Spaulding, the sales director for the New York Subways Advertising Company, said in 1971 that it "was a World War II pinup phenomenon and then lost social significance." Miss Subways was of "mythic significance to many", with Mayor Ed Koch saying in 1979:

In 1983, when there were public calls for the contest to continue, a Metropolitan Transportation Authority representative stated that it would be "irrelevant and socially unacceptable", and thus not viable, to restart Miss Subways. Tn 2004, journalist Melanie Bush commented:

Ellen Hart Sturm, owner of the New York diner Ellen's Stardust Diner, was Miss Subways in 1959; her diner features photos of many past Miss Subways on the walls.

Revival of "Miss Subways"
In 2017, the "Miss Subways Pageant" was resurrected, produced by The City Reliquary where the event was held. The judges, including Roger Clark, reporter for NY1, awarded the title, sash, and crown to Lisa Levy, who participated on a platform of being "a postmenopausal queen." Miss Congeniality, an addition to the original pageant, was taken by Suzie Sims-Fletcher. The following year, 2018, saw the addition of The Riders Alliance as an organizer of the event, which moved to Littlefield where it returned in 2019.

List of "Miss Subways" title-holders

In popular culture
 In the 1944 musical On the Town, one of the main characters falls in love with "Miss Turnstiles" after seeing her picture on the subway. Lyricist Betty Comden later claimed that the musical influenced the contest's selection process to include more diverse contestants, due to the casting of the half-Japanese Sono Osato as Miss Turnstiles in the original production.
 Lawrence Ferlinghetti's poetry collection A Coney Island of the Mind contains a poem entitled "Meet Miss Subways."
 Donald Sosin's 1972 song cycle "Third Rail" includes the entire text of a Miss Subways poster, but with the name of the girl and her school changed at her request.
 Cher's 1974 album, Dark Lady, featured the comedic song, "Miss Subway of 1952", written by Mary F. Cain, about a once-beautiful woman who has not aged gracefully.
 In the 1996 The Nanny episode "Tattoo" (Season 4 episode 9), Fran claims to have won the Miss Subways title.
 In 1996, Marga Gomez debuted a show called 'A Line Around the Block' in which a character says: "You're Miss America. No, better than that. Miss Subways."
 The 2018 historical fiction novel The Subway Girls (St. Martin's Press) by Susie Orman Schnall is a dual-timeline story of a 1949 Miss Subways contestant and a modern-day female advertising executive.
 In the 2018 novel Miss Subways (Macmillan Publishers), writer and actor David Duchovny re-imagines Miss Subways as Emer, a New York City teacher whose world intersects with mythical figures in her quest for love.

References

Further reading
 "The Miss Subways Reunion", WFUV (audio)
 "Saw You On The E Train", Fiona Gardner and Amy Zimmer, The New York Times, December 29, 2007 (photo essay)

Beauty pageants in the United States
New York City Subway
1941 establishments in New York City
American awards
Women in New York City